Temochloa is a genus of flowering plants belonging to the family Poaceae.

Its native range is Thaiand.

Species:

Temochloa liliana

References

Poaceae
Poaceae genera